|}

The Gallinule Stakes is a Group 3 flat horse race in Ireland open to three-year-old thoroughbreds. It is run at the Curragh over a distance of 1 mile and 2 furlongs (2,012 metres), and it is scheduled to take place each year in May.

History
The event is named after Gallinule, the Irish-based sire of Pretty Polly. It was originally restricted to three-year-olds, and for a period it held Group 2 status. It was extended to 1 mile and 4 furlongs in 1976, and reverted to its previous length in 1983.

The race was opened to older horses in 1994. It was downgraded to Group 3 level in 1998. It was staged at Leopardstown in 2001 and 2002, and its former age restriction was restored in 2004.

Records
Leading jockey since 1950 (8 wins):
 Lester Piggott – Hail the Pirates (1973), Meneval (1976), Alleged (1977), Inkerman (1978), Gonzales (1980), Lord Duke (1985), Sportsworld (1991), Right Win (1994)

Leading trainer since 1950 (16 wins):
 Aidan O'Brien - Johan Cruyff (1997), Urban Ocean (1999), Glyndebourne (2000), Della Francesca (2002), Meath (2004), Puerto Rico (2006), Alexander of Hales (2007), Hebridean (2008), Grand Ducal (2009), Jan Vermeer (2010), Alexander Pope (2011), Leading Light (2013), Adelaide (2014), Beacon Rock (2016), Homesman (2017), Constantinople (2019)

Winners since 1977

Earlier winners

 1950: Dark Warrior
 1951: Chadwick Manor
 1952: Windy Torrent
 1953: Chamier
 1954: Hidalgo
 1955: Arctic Time
 1956: No Comment
 1957: After the Show
 1958: Tharp
 1959: Anthony
 1960: Chamour
 1961: Royal Avenue
 1962: Saint Denys
 1963: Vic Mo Chroi
 1964: Master Buck
 1965: Baljour
 1966: Busted
 1967: Atherstone Wood
 1968: Giolla Mear
 1969: Onondaga
 1970: Saracen Sword
 1971: Grenfall
 1972: Bog Road
 1973: Hail the Pirates
 1974: Sir Penfro
 1975: King Pellinore
 1976: Meneval

See also
 Horse racing in Ireland
 List of Irish flat horse races

References
 Paris-Turf:
 Racing Post:

 galopp-sieger.de – Gallinule Stakes.
 ifhaonline.org – International Federation of Horseracing Authorities – Gallinule Stakes (2019).
 irishracinggreats.com – Gallinule Stakes (Group 3).
 pedigreequery.com – Gallinule Stakes – Curragh.

Flat races in Ireland
Curragh Racecourse
Flat horse races for three-year-olds